The MU School of Health Professions is the University of Missouri system’s only school of health professions and the state’s only public health program located on a health sciences campus. Its mission is to improve the health and well-being of others.

The school is an important member of the University of Missouri Health System. Other members include the Sinclair School of Nursing, the School of Medicine, University Hospitals and Clinics and University Physicians.

History
The School of Health Professions became an independent academic unit by action of the University of Missouri Board of Curators on Dec. 14, 2000. The school’s programs have a long and distinguished history, some dating back to the early 1900s, and have produced many well respected and nationally recognized professionals.

At the time of its establishment, the school consisted of five departments, including Clinical and Diagnostic Sciences; Health Psychology; Occupational Therapy; Physical Therapy; and Speech, Language and Hearing Sciences. Addressing the increasing health care needs of Missouri and across the nation, the school has continued to grow in programs to prepare professionals in health care, public health and social work.

Richard Oliver, a professor of pathology and anatomical science, was the founding dean of the school. He retired in 2013 to become president of Association of Schools of Allied Health Professions. Kristofer Hagglund, who had served as associate dean since 2001, was named dean in 2013.

Growth and success 
The School of Health Professions is experiencing record high enrollment. Since 2000, the number of students studying health professions has more than quintupled; 3,500 students are expected to be enrolled in Fall 2022. More than 11% of MU students are in the School of Health Professions, and that number continues to grow each year.

The School of Health Professions is a major provider of Missouri’s health care workforce with 82 percent of recent alumni working or continuing their education in Missouri. MU Health Care is the top employer of graduates from the MU School of Health Professions.

The school and its departments operate multiple outreach services or facilities and offer numerous other service learning projects, allowing students and faculty to engage in comprehensive, interdisciplinary education and research. Its students participate in 80,150 clinical or patient hours per year for all programs.

References

External links
Official site

University of Missouri
Educational institutions established in 2000
Education in Columbia, Missouri
2000 establishments in Missouri
Medical schools in Missouri
University subdivisions in Missouri